Kwami Sefa Kayi (born 20 June 1970) also known as Chairman General is a Ghanaian media personality, broadcast journalist and public speaker. He is currently the host of Peace FM's morning show popularly known as “Kokrokoo”.

Personal life and education 
He completed his secondary school education at the Okuapeman Secondary School in Akropong Akuapem. Sefa Kayi gained an Executive Master of Arts in Conflict, Peace and Security (EMCPS) programme from the Kofi Annan International Peacekeeping Training Centre (KAIPTC) in 2018.

Career 
He is a broadcast journalist, public speaker and a Master of Ceremony. He is currently the host of Peace FM's morning show popularly known as “Kokrokoo. Kwami Sefa Kayi on August 6, 2021, was sworn in as a board member of the National Petroleum Authority.

Entertainment 
He hosted the maiden edition of Ghana Music Awards until 2007. In 2019 he co-hosted the 20th VGMA with Berla Mundi.

Here are some awards his show has won:

Awards and recognition 
Radio and Television Personalities Awards RTP Personality Of The Decade 2010–2020.

Philanthropy 
He is the owner of Kokrokoo Foundation which was established in 2015. In April 2019, the foundation donated incubators worth $100,000.00 to help curb the mortality rate of children born pre-term.
|-
| 2013
| rowspan="3"| Radio Morning Show Host of the Year
| rowspan="3"| Radio and TV Personality Awards
| 
|-
| 2014
| 
|-
| 2015
| 
|}
The 'Project 100' drive was conceived in 2014 and had the aim to provide at least 100 incubators to a number of health institutions in the country. As of April 2021, 35 incubators had been provided.

References 

Ghanaian journalists
Living people
1970 births